The men's double-mini trampoline competition in trampoline gymnastics at the 2022 World Games took place on 15 July 2022 at the University of Alabama Birmingham in Birmingham, United States.

Competition format
A total of 10 athletes entered the competition. Best 8 athletes from preliminary advances to the final.

Results

Preliminary

Final

References

External links
 Results on IWGA website

Trampoline gymnastics at the 2022 World Games